The Joe Brown House and Farmstead is a historic property in rural White County, Arkansas. It is a single-story dogtrot house, with a corrugated metal roof and board-and-batten siding. The front facade has a shed-roof porch extending across part of the front, sheltering two entrances giving access to the two pens and the breezeway. The property includes a well and the remains of a log smokehouse. The house was built about 1890, and is one of White County's few surviving 19th-century dogtrots.

The property was listed on the National Register of Historic Places in 1991, at which time it was reported to be in deteriorated condition.

See also
National Register of Historic Places listings in White County, Arkansas

References

Houses on the National Register of Historic Places in Arkansas
Houses in White County, Arkansas
National Register of Historic Places in White County, Arkansas
Dogtrot architecture in Arkansas
1890 establishments in Arkansas
Houses completed in 1890
Farms on the National Register of Historic Places in Arkansas